Ángel Santiago Barboza Manzzi (born October 3, 1989) is a Uruguayan footballer currently playing for Deportivo Achuapa.

Career
On 26 July 2012, he scored a goal against Bolivian side Aurora in the 2012 Copa Sudamericana which was the first goal ever for Cerro Largo F.C. in an international competition.

In January 2013, he signed a new deal with Second Division club Atenas de San Carlos.

In July 2013, he was transferred to Ecuadorian side LDU Loja with a loan deal of six months with an option of acquisition.

References

External links
 Profile at BDFA 
 

1989 births
Living people
People from Rocha Department
Uruguayan footballers
Uruguayan expatriate footballers
Rocha F.C. players
Atenas de San Carlos players
Cerro Largo F.C. players
L.D.U. Loja footballers
Cobreloa footballers
Chilean Primera División players
Liga Nacional de Fútbol Profesional de Honduras players
C.D. Marathón players
Uruguayan expatriate sportspeople in Chile
Uruguayan expatriate sportspeople in Ecuador
Expatriate footballers in Chile
Expatriate footballers in Ecuador
Association football forwards